Breaking No New Ground! is the debut EP by Bongwater, released in 1987 through Shimmy Disc. In 1998, the album was remastered by Alan Douches and Kramer for their inclusion in Box of Bongwater set.

Track listing

Personnel 
Adapted from the Breaking No New Ground! liner notes.

Bongwater
Kramer – vocals, instruments, engineering, production
David Licht – instruments
Ann Magnuson – vocals, instruments

Production and additional personnel
Axle Stone Lead – instruments
Samm Bennett – instruments
Chris Cochrane – instruments
Fred Frith – instruments
Davey Williams – instruments

Release history

References

External links 
 

1987 debut EPs
Bongwater (band) albums
Albums produced by Kramer (musician)
Shimmy Disc EPs